Vidošević is a Croat surname. Notable people with the surname include:

 Ilija Vidošević (1802–1867), Croatian Franciscan
 Joško Vidošević (1935–1990), Croatian footballer
 Marin Vidošević (born 1986), Croatian footballer
 Nadan Vidošević (born 1960), Croatian politician and businessman

Croatian surnames